Elections to Thanet District Council took place on Thursday 2 May 2019, alongside other local elections across the country and parish council elections across Thanet. The result saw the Conservative party return to being the largest party on the council, after UKIP formed a majority then split into groups. The Labour party also became the second largest party on the council. Labour gained the most seats in Thanet over any council area in the country.

Initially after the 2019 election, the Conservative party led the council with a minority - however, after a vote of no confidence in October 2019, Labour now operate a confidence-and-supply arrangement with the Greens and Thanet Independents.

Summary

Election result

|-

Ward results

Beacon Road

Birchington North

Birchington South

Bradstowe

Central Harbour

Cliffsend & Pegwell

Cliftonville East

Cliftonville West

Dane Valley

Eastcliff

Garlinge

Kingsgate

Margate Central

Nethercourt

Newington

Northwood

Salmestone

Sir Moses Montefiore

St. Peter's

Thanet Villages

Viking

Westbrook

Westgate-on-Sea

By-elections

Central Harbour

Dane Valley

Newington

Cliftonville East

Thanet Villages

Nethercourt

References

Thanet District Council elections
Thanet District Council elections
2019
2010s in Kent